Robert Johnson (Rocky) Spane (born May 5, 1940) was a vice admiral in the United States Navy. He was Commander, Naval Air Force Pacific from 1993 to 1996. Spane is a 1962 U.S. Naval Academy graduate.

References

United States Navy admirals
1940 births
Living people
People from Ely, Nevada